The 2000 season was the New Orleans Saints' 34th in the National Football League and their 25th playing home games at the Louisiana Superdome. The Saints were looking to improve on their 3–13 finish from a year earlier under new head coach Jim Haslett. Not only did the Saints do so, but they finished with a 10–6 record to win the NFC West and advanced to the playoffs for the first time since 1992. They also won their first ever playoff game in franchise history by defeating the defending Super Bowl champion St. Louis Rams in the Wild Card round. The Saints went no further, though, as they lost to the Minnesota Vikings in the next round.

This was the only time the Saints made the playoffs under Haslett. For the next four seasons, the Saints fell out of contention. They would not return to the playoffs until 2006.

New wide receiver Joe Horn quickly emerged as a star, catching 94 passes for 1,340 and 9 touchdowns, and he was selected to the Pro Bowl after the season.

It was the only season in which the Saints defeated the Rams in the playoffs, as they were defeated by them in the NFC Championship 18 years afterward.

Offseason

NFL Draft

Personnel

Staff

Roster

Regular season

Schedule

Standings

Playoffs

Player stats

Passing

Rushing

Receiving

Defense

Sacks

Interceptions

Awards and records 
Jim Haslett, AP Coach of the Year,
Jim Haslett, College and Pro Football Newsweekly Coach of the Year,
Jim Haslett, Football Digest Coach of the Year,
Jim Haslett, Football News Coach of the Year,
Jim Haslett, Pro Football Writers Association Coach of the Year,
Jim Haslett, Sports Illustrated Coach of the Year 
Jim Haslett, USA Today NFC Coach of the Year,

Milestones 
 Ricky Williams, 1st 1000 rushing yards season

References 

Saints on Pro Football Reference
Saints on jt-sw.com

New Orleans Saints Season, 2000
New Orleans Saints seasons
NFC West championship seasons
New